Mu'izz al-Din Mahmud was the Zengid Emir of the Jazira 1208–1241. He was successor of Imad al-Din Zengi II.

See also
 Zengid dynasty

1241 deaths
Zengid rulers
Year of birth unknown
13th-century monarchs in the Middle East